John William Logan (16 August 1912 – 8 October 1980) was an English professional footballer born in Horden, near Peterlee, County Durham who played in the Football League for Darlington, Barnsley and Sheffield Wednesday. He played as a wing half.

References

1912 births
1980 deaths
People from Horden
Footballers from County Durham
English footballers
Association football wing halves
Darlington Town F.C. players
Charlton Athletic F.C. players
Darlington F.C. players
Barnsley F.C. players
Sheffield Wednesday F.C. players
English Football League players